The Civic Party of Moldova (PCM) was a political party in Moldova led by Vladimir Solonari.

History
The party joined the For a Democratic and Prosperous Moldova alliance to contest the 1998 elections. The alliance received 18% of the vote, winning 24 of the 101 seats and becoming the third-largest faction in Parliament. It formed the Alliance for Democracy and Reforms coalition together with Democratic Convention of Moldova and the Party of Democratic Forces, which was able to form a government led by Ion Ciubuc.

The alliance was dissolved prior to the 2001 elections.

References

Defunct political parties in Moldova